Statistics of Soviet Top League for the 1983 season.

Teams

Promoted teams
 Zhalgiris Vilnuis – champion (returning after 21 seasons)
 Nistru Kishinev – 2nd place (returning after nine seasons)

League standings

Results

Top scorers
18 goals
 Yuri Gavrilov (Spartak Moscow)

17 goals
 Igor Gurinovich (Dinamo Minsk)

15 goals
 Volodymyr Fink (Chornomorets)
 Khoren Hovhannisyan (Ararat)
 Mykhaylo Sokolovsky (Shakhtar)
 Andrei Yakubik (Pakhtakor)

14 goals
 Sigitas Jakubauskas (Žalgiris)

13 goals
 Viktor Kolyadko (CSKA Moscow)
 Oleh Taran (Dnipro)

11 goals
 Valery Gazzaev (Dynamo Moscow)
 Valeriy Petrakov (Torpedo Moscow)
 Igor Ponomaryov (Neftchi)
 Ramaz Shengelia (Dinamo Tbilisi)
 Aleksandr Tarkhanov (CSKA Moscow)
 Vadym Yevtushenko (Dynamo Kyiv)

Medal squads
(league appearances and goals listed in brackets)

Number of teams by union republic

References
Soviet Union - List of final tables (RSSSF)

Soviet Top League seasons
1
Soviet
Soviet